Dan Norman (born 8 September 1997) is an Ireland international rugby league footballer who plays as a  for Swinton Lions in the RFL Championship, on loan from St Helens in the Betfred Super League.

He previously played for the Widnes Vikings in the Super League and the Championship, and on loan from Widnes at the North Wales Crusaders in League 1. He has also played for the London Broncos in the Betfred Championship.

Background
He was born in Warrington, Cheshire, England.

Career

Widnes Vikings
Norman made his début for the Widnes club in the Super League against Salford in June 2018. He played 20 games and only scored 1 try.

North Wales Crusaders (loan)
In 2018 Dan signed (on loan) for the North Wales Crusaders where e played 13 games and scored 1 try for them.

Salford Red Devils (loan)
On 8 July 2021 it was reported that he had joined Salford in the Super League on a short loan
On 9 August 2021 it was reported that he had re-joined the Salford club in the Super League on a one-week loan, following the announcement of  Lee Mossop's immediate retirement due to injury.

Leigh Leopards (dr)
He signed for the Leigh Leopards on loan of the 2022 season where he played twice and scored once.

St Helens
In 2021 it was reported that Dan Norman went to St Helens in the Super League with a 1 year deal he would later in 2022 sign another contract for St Helens for another year. He won the Super League with  St Helens for 2 years on the trot.

Ireland
In the 2022 Rugby League World Cup he be announced in the Ireland national rugby league team world cup squad who would later make his debut versus New Zealand national rugby league team off of the bench.

References

External links
St Helens profile
Saints Heritage Society profile
Ireland profile

1997 births
Living people
English rugby league players
Leigh Leopards players
London Broncos players
North Wales Crusaders players
Rugby league players from Warrington
Rugby league props
Salford Red Devils players
St Helens R.F.C. players
Swinton Lions players
Widnes Vikings players